The V64V engine was a purpose-built and specially made  naturally-aspirated DOHC V6 engine, designed, developed and produced by Austin-Rover, for the MG Metro 6R4 Group B rally car, between 1985 and 1986.

Applications 
MG Metro 6R4

References

Automobile engines
Internal combustion piston engines
V6 engines
Gasoline engines by model
Engines by model
Rover engines